Septin-8 is a protein that in humans is encoded by the SEPT8 gene.

Function 

SEPT8 is a member of the highly conserved septin family. Septins are 40- to 60-kD GTPases that assemble as filamentous scaffolds. They are involved in the organization of submembranous structures, in neuronal polarity, and in vesicle trafficking.

Interactions 

SEPT8 has been shown to interact with PFTK1 and SEPT5.

References

Further reading